Buck Donic is an unincorporated community in Dunklin County, in the U.S. state of Missouri.

History
Buck Donic is a name said to be derived from regional dialect meaning "beach tree among the rocks".

References

Unincorporated communities in Dunklin County, Missouri
Unincorporated communities in Missouri